Amite Hasan (born 15 September 2001) is a Bangladeshi cricketer. He made his List A debut for Shinepukur Cricket Club in the 2018–19 Dhaka Premier Division Cricket League on 14 March 2019. He made his first-class debut on 9 November 2019, for Sylhet Division in the 2019–20 National Cricket League, where he scored a century and was named the player of the match. He made his Twenty20 debut on 4 June 2021, for Shinepukur Cricket Club in the 2021 Dhaka Premier Division Twenty20 Cricket League.

References

External links
 

2001 births
Living people
Bangladeshi cricketers
Shinepukur Cricket Club cricketers
Place of birth missing (living people)